McShane may refer to:

 McShane (name) 
 McShane Bell Foundry, church bell manufacturer, located in Glen Burnie, Maryland, USA

See also
 McShane's identity, geometric topology
 Shane (disambiguation)
 MacShane
 O'Shane